Steel Attack is a Swedish power metal band from Sala ,formed in 1995.

Biography 
Stefan Westerberg and Dennis Vestman formed Mayer's Eve in 1995. The band changed their name to Steel Attack in 1997 due to many coming and going members.

The band started out with the style of European power metal bands, with lyrical content about epic battles, dragons and swords mixed with high-pitched vocals. Albums from that time is Where Mankind Fails (1999), Fall into Madness (2001) and the album Predator of the Empire (2003).
However, with a change of vocalist in 2003 (Ronny Hemlin), the band and the 2004 album Enslaved got a new "direction," both musically and lyrically. Their old power metal sound was re-wrought to be more aggressive, and the standard lyrical content of most power metal bands (dragons, swords, etc.) was no longer used. Ronny brought more mystical, mature, religion-related lyrics, in order to fit the band's new heavier sound.

With the 2006 release Diabolic Symphony, the band developed further to include more progressive metal elements. Diabolic Symphony is their most diverse album to date. New to the album was the use of keyboards, which helped to take a big step forward in creating a bigger, epic sound.

During 2007 three members decided to leave the band, Anden Andersson, Tony Elfving and Johan Jalonen. Since then, all three positions have been replaced, namely Johan Löfgren (bass), Peter Morén (drums) and Simon Johansson (guitars).

This new line-up of the band recorded their new album "Carpe DiEnd" during end of 2007/beginning of 2008 and the album was released 22 February 2008 by Massacre Records.

In the beginning of 2009 guitarist Simon Johansson quit the band due to personal reasons, and his replacement was the returning guitarist Johan Jalonen Penn.

On 23 November, Steel Attack parted ways with Hemlin, Löfgren, and Morén for reasons beyond their control.

On 29 November, the original line up got back to where it all started with from the albums "Where Mankind Fails" and "Fall into Madness."

Band members

Current line-up 
Steve Steel (Stefan Westerberg) (1995–2001, 2009–) – vocals & bass (Carnal Forge, In Thy Dreams, Leech, Asperity, Kryptillusion, 8 Foot Sativa, World Below)
John Allan – guitar (1998–)
Dennis Vestman – guitar (1995–2003, 2009–) (Carnal Forge, Soulskinner, Grand Design)
Andreas Vollmer – drums (1996–1999, 2000–2001, 2009–)

Former members 
Vocals:
Dick Johnson (2002–2003)
Ronny Hemlin (2003–2009)

Guitar:
Johan Jalonen Penn (2004–2007, 2009)
Simon Johansson (2007–2009) (Abstrakt Algebra, Memory Garden, Fifth Reason, Bibleblack, Wolf)

Bass:
Freddie (1995–1996)
Patrick Späth (2002–2003) (Soulskinner) (also vocals)
Anden Andersson (2003–2007)
Johan Löfgren (2007–2009)

Drums:
Roger Raw (1999–2000) (Wombbath)
Mike Stark (2001–2005) (Into Desolation)
Tony Elfving (2005–2007)
Peter Morén (2007–2009)

Timeline

Discography

External links 
 Official website
 Facebook

Musical groups established in 1995
Swedish power metal musical groups